Fyre: The Greatest Party That Never Happened is a 2019 American documentary film about Billy McFarland and the failed Fyre Festival of 2017. It was directed by Chris Smith, and produced by Danny Gabai and Mick Purzycki and was released on Netflix on January 18, 2019.

Production
The film was co-produced by Jerry Media, the social media agency responsible for promoting the Fyre Festival and covering up the fraud, and MATTE Projects, the production company that directed the Fyre Festival's promotional shoot. Jerry Media approached VICE with the idea of a documentary three months after the events. According to Netflix, the documentary was Smith's idea.

Reception
The website's critical consensus reads, "Fyre smolders with agonizing tension when a party in paradise goes awry, but this slickly assembled documentary reserves its greatest horror for damning observations about the dangers of wealth." Metacritic, which uses a normalized average, assigned the film a score of 75 out of 100, based on 26 critics, indicating "generally favorable reviews".

In reviewing Fyre and Fyre Fraud, a similar documentary that premiered on Hulu, The A.V. Club stated that "Fyre is the stronger, more worthwhile documentary, but its counterpart is a helpful reminder that, like so many stories, one account can't contain the whole truth."

In April 2019, Netflix reported that 20 million households had watched the film during its first month of release.

On the 71st Primetime Creative Arts Emmy Awards, Fyre earned four nominations, Outstanding Documentary or Nonfiction Special, Outstanding Directing for a Documentary/Nonfiction Program, Outstanding Sound Editing for a Nonfiction Program (Single or Multi-Camera), and Outstanding Sound Mixing for a Nonfiction Program (Single or Multi-Camera).

See also
List of original films distributed by Netflix

References

External links
 
 

2019 documentary films
2019 films
American documentary films
Documentary films about music festivals
Films directed by Chris Smith
Netflix original documentary films
2010s English-language films
2010s American films